Cheong Yoke Choy, JP, OBE (16 July 1873 – 26 May 1958) was a famous philanthropist during the British Malaya era. During his lifetime, he became one of the early developers of Kuala Lumpur, together with several prominent figures from the Chinese community at the time. He was well respected, much loved, and affectionately known as 'The Elderly Philanthropist' for all the charitable work he drove and supported even at an advanced age.

Early life
Cheong Yoke Choy was born in Xinhui, China, on the 22nd of the sixth lunar month (16 July) in 1873, and came from humble beginnings. To support his family's livelihood, he moved to Guangzhou at the age of fourteen to work as a live-in servant. Although his wages were low, he benefitted from learning Cantonese, the main dialect of Guangdong, through his work. Two years later, he travelled to Malaya, where he arrived in Rawang to work as an office boy for the local council.

Six months after arriving in Malaya, he moved to Kuala Lumpur where he worked at the 'Tong Hing Long Company', a provision store owned and started by Loke Yew, who took an immediate liking to him. Even though he started off performing menial tasks, his hard-working and humble nature earned him Yew's trust, who gradually handed him more important responsibilities. When Loke Yew travelled up north to Perak to explore the possibilities of starting up a tin mining business, Cheong, although young, was left in charge of his provision store. Cheong saw Loke Yew not only as a benefactor but also a mentor.  

In 1897, Cheong and his fellow Guangdong clansmen Chan Wing, Chew Kam Chuan, Liew Weng Chee and San Ah Weng formed a kongsi called the Hoong Fatt Tin Mining Company, pooling together their limited savings to prospect for tin in the area adjacent to Sungai Besi. This was considered quite a risky undertaking at the time, as two other Chinese kongsis and a European partnership had already attempted to mine for tin in the same area. Fortunately, through  determination and luck, the group got their reward when they discovered one of the largest tin deposits in Malaya. Now self sufficient following the discovery of the mine, Cheong was able to send for his parents who were still living in China.

With the support of Loke Yew, Cheong and a few other partners including Chan Wing co-founded Kwong Yik Bank in July 1913. Since the bank's inception, and apart from a brief period between 1916-17 when Loke Yew was elected chairman, Cheong held the post of chairman of the board of directors up until his death in 1958.

Education, associations and welfare
Cheong understood the importance of a formal education even though he himself lacked it. In 1918 he single-handedly founded 'Pak Peng Free School', an all-boys school aimed at providing free education to students from very poor families. He was considered by many to be very progressive for his time because – unlike a lot of the other Chinese patriarchs at the time – he believed that girls should also receive a proper education. This prompted him to form a partnership with Mr. Liao Rong Zhi to set up and run the 'Pak Weng All Girls School' at Sultan Lane – one of the few non-missionary girls school at the time. In 1926 he and three others – namely Xin Bai Hui, Liao Rong Zhi and Au Yang Xue Feng – went on to help establish Kwong Siew Free School; Confucian Private Secondary School; Kuen Cheng Girls School and also act as trustees for Wah Kiew Primary School.

His long held belief that women should be treated fairly led him along with Liao Rong Zhi to found the Selangor King George V Silver Jubilee Home in Kuala Lumpur, which was originally intended as a shelter for poor and aged Chinese women – found sleeping along five-footways in the late 1930s – from raiding Japanese armies during the Second World War.

He also played an equally active role in helping establish, run and fund Chinese associations around Kuala Lumpur. Between 1916 and 1933 he acted as the Treasurer for the Kwong Tong Cemetery in Kuala Lumpur. During this period he funded the construction of "Qing Jia Ting", one of the ten pavilions in the Kwong Tong Cemetery. He was the 1st President of the Selangor Chinese Assembly Hall between 1935 and 1942; the Treasurer of the Kwong Tong Association Kuala Lumpur between 1939 and 1953; and in 1952 the President of the Selangor Kwong Chow Association, which he helped finance.

Among the many other posts he held include Treasurer of the Selangor Chinese Chamber of Commerce; President of the Chinese Maternity Hospital Kuala Lumpur; Treasurer of Tung Shin Hospital Kuala Lumpur and also property trustees for many organisations namely Kwong Siew Association Selangor & Kuala Lumpur, Sin Sei See Yeh Temple, Chik Sin Tong Funeral Parlour and Selangor Chin Woo Athletic Association.

It is not an exaggeration to categorically state that Cheong contributed immensely to Chinese schools and associations in Kuala Lumpur. In recognition of the important role he played amongst the Chinese community in Kuala Lumpur, the local British government appointed him as a Chinese counselor, a Justice of the Peace (JP) and an Officer in The Most Excellent Order of the British Empire (OBE).

This much-loved and well-respected philanthropist also has a street (Lorong Cheong Yoke Choy) in Kuala Lumpur posthumously named after him.   There was also another street near Peel Road / Cochrane Road named after him, Jalan Cheong Yoke Choy, located within the government quarters (for its civil service staffs).  However, the entire government quarters area was demolished to make way for development, and so did the road that was named after him.

Death
He died at the age of 85 years on 26 May 1958, and like his father, Cheong Keng Yu, was buried in the Kwong Tong Cemetery Kuala Lumpur. His funeral procession was said to have been one of the grandest at the time; attended by all whom he touched with his generosity and benevolence.

216 Jalan Pudu

The land that Berjaya Times Square currently sits on used to belong to Cheong and his descendants before it was sold to Berjaya Group's Tan Sri Vincent Tan just before the Asian Financial Crisis hit Malaysia. The grand colonial mansion that once stood proudly on the land before it was demolished to make way for Berjaya Times Square, housed officers from the Japanese Army when Japan controlled Malaya during the Second World War. Despite the many rumours flying around, the Japanese did not torture or execute any of their prisoners in the compound. The large backyard behind the mansion did however house a well-equipped bomb shelter.

There stands a corporate building along Jalan Maharajalela (formerly Birch Road), that is named after his son, Cheong Wing Chan. The facade of the building are akin to those buildings (double storey) that once stood in that area, which belonged to the family of Cheong Yoke Choy (known as Woh Sang Garden – named after a famous Qing era imperial officer).

Standalone cinemas
Cheong's descendants built and owned a stable of large-screen cinemas in Kuala Lumpur, namely Rex, Federal and Capitol, which were all operated by Golden Screen Cinemas. Rex which commenced business in 1976, was in its heyday a front-runner amongst Malaysian cinemas. It boasted a seating capacity in excess of a thousand and had the distinction of being the first cinema in Malaysia to install Digital Sound Processors. As a result of this, when Jurassic Park was first shown in Malaysian cinemas, movie-goers queued for hours for the tickets, and the box-office was sold-out for weeks on end. Sadly, multi-screen cineplexes have since all but driven stand-alone cinemas – showing a single movie at a seating – out of business; and after more than 25 years in operation Rex closed its doors for the final time on 15 November 2002, leaving behind many fond memories.

References

External links
Selangor and Federal Territory Kwong Siew Association
Kwong Tong Cemetery
The KL & Selangor Chinese Assembly Hall

1873 births
1958 deaths
Chinese emigrants to British Malaya
Officers of the Order of the British Empire
Malaysian people of Cantonese descent
Malaysian philanthropists
People from Xinhui District